This is an incomplete list of documented attempts to assassinate Adolf Hitler.

All attempts occurred in the German Reich, except where noted. All attempts involved citizens of the German Reich, except where noted. No fewer than 42 plots have been uncovered by historians. However, the true number cannot be accurately determined due to an unknown number of undocumented cases.

See also
Operation Foxley
Operation Spark (1940)
Operation Valkyrie

References

Further reading 
 

Adolf Hitler
 
Hitler
Nazi-related lists